Letizia Borghesi (born 16 October 1998) is an Italian professional racing cyclist, who currently rides for the UCI Women's World Tour team EF Education-Tibco-SVB. She previously rode for UCI Women's Continental Team .

Major results
2017
 4th Overall Vuelta a Colombia Femenina
2019
 1st Stage 4 Giro Rosa
 7th Brabantse Pijl
 9th Overall Setmana Ciclista Valenciana
2022
 8th Scheldeprijs
 9th Nokere Koerse voor Dames

References

External links

1998 births
Living people
Italian female cyclists
Place of birth missing (living people)
Cyclo-cross cyclists
People from Cles
Sportspeople from Trentino
Cyclists from Trentino-Alto Adige/Südtirol